The Harder They Fall is a 1956 American boxing film noir directed by Mark Robson with a screenplay by Philip Yordan, based on Budd Schulberg's 1947 novel. It was Humphrey Bogart's final film role. It received an Oscar nomination for Best Cinematography, Black and White for Burnett Guffey at the 29th Academy Awards.

Plot
Sportswriter Eddie Willis, broke after the newspaper he works for goes under, is hired as a PR man by boxing promoter Nick Benko. Nick has recruited Toro Moreno, a towering Argentinian. Despite Toro's lack of fighting ability, Nick plans to use his size as a gimmick to draw fans to his fights. Unbeknownst to Toro and his manager, Luís Agrandi, all of his fights are fixed to make the public believe that he is a talented boxer.

Eddie feels misgivings about the scheme, but the lure of a huge payday is enough to make him ignore the venture's dishonesty. He is able to spin Toro as a legitimate up-and-comer even when his first fight goes so disastrously wrong that the boxing commission threatens to open an investigation.

As Benko's entourage crosses the country in a bus bedecked with advertising for the fighter, Toro gradually becomes a ranked contender. Throughout the tour, Eddie handles negotiations with other boxing managers to ensure Toro's fights remain fixed.

Toro fights Gus Dundee, whose previous fight with champion Buddy Brannen has left him with a broken neck. After the Toro fight, Dundee collapses and dies. Toro is overcome with guilt, thinking he killed Dundee, and wishes to return to Argentina. In a last-ditch attempt to protect the upcoming bout with Brannen, Eddie tells Toro the truth: that Brannen was responsible for Dundee's condition, that Toro is no fighter, and that all his fights have been fixed.

During the Brannen fight, Toro sustains a brutal beating. Afterward, Eddie learns that Benko has sold Toro's contract to another manager. While Eddie gets his promised payout of $26,000, Benko has rigged the accounting so Toro earns only $49.07. Ashamed of his part in the farce and not wanting to see Toro exploited any further, Eddie gives Toro the $26,000 and puts him on a plane to Argentina before Benko's men can stop them.

Though Benko threatens to harm Eddie, Eddie begins writing an exposé about the corruption.

Cast
 Humphrey Bogart as Eddie Willis 
 Rod Steiger as Nick Benko 
 Jan Sterling as Beth Willis 
 Mike Lane as Toro Moreno 
 Max Baer as Buddy Brannen 
 Jersey Joe Walcott as George 
 Edward Andrews as Jim Weyerhause 
 Harold J. Stone as Art Leavitt 
 Carlos Montalbán as Luís Agrandi 
 Nehemiah Persoff as Leo 
 Felice Orlandi as Vince Fawcett 
 Herbie Faye as Max 
 Rusty Lane as Danny McKeogh 
 Jack Albertson as Pop
 Tina Carver as Nick's wife

Production
In early 1956, Bogart was diagnosed with esophageal cancer, and he died on January 14, 1957. Steiger recalled the actor's professionalism during production, even while coping with the disease:

"Bogey and I got on very well. Unlike some other stars, when they had closeups, you might have been relegated to a two-shot, or cut out altogether. Bogey didn't play those games. He was a professional and had tremendous authority. He'd come in exactly at 9am and leave at precisely 6pm. I remember once walking to lunch in between takes and seeing Bogey on the lot. I shouldn't have because his work was finished for the day. I asked him why he was still on the lot, and he said, 'They want to shoot some retakes of my closeups because my eyes are too watery'. A little while later, after the film, somebody came up to me with word of Bogey's death. Then it struck me. His eyes were watery because he was in pain with the cancer. I thought: 'How dumb can you be, Rodney'!"

The film was released with two different endings: one where Eddie Willis (inspired by sports writer Harold Conrad, according to Conrad) demanded that boxing be banned altogether, and the other where he merely insisted that there be a federal investigation into boxing. The video version contains the "harder" ending, while most television prints end with the "softer" message. Occasionally inaudible in a take, some of Bogart's lines as Willis are reported to have been dubbed in post-production by Paul Frees.

Reception

Critical response
The film premiered at the 1956 Cannes Film Festival. The New York Times film critic Bosley Crowther liked the film, writing "It's a brutal and disagreeable story, probably a little far-fetched, and without Mr. Schulberg's warmest character—the wistful widow who bestowed her favors on busted pugs. But with all the arcana of the fight game that Mr. Yordan and Mr. Robson have put into it—along with their bruising, brutish fight scenes—it makes for a lively, stinging film."

Dennis Schwartz wrote "The unwell Bogie's last film is not a knockout, but his hard-hitting performance is terrific as a has-been sports journalist out of desperation taking a job as a publicist for a fight fixer in order to get a bank account ... The social conscience film is realistic, but fails to be shocking or for that matter convincing."

Lawsuit
Primo Carnera sued Columbia for $1.5 million in damages, alleging that the film was based on him and invaded his privacy.  The lawsuit was not successful.

See also
 List of American films of 1956

References

Sources

External links
 
 
 
 

1956 films
1956 drama films
1950s sports drama films
American black-and-white films
American business films
American sports drama films
American boxing films
Columbia Pictures films
Films à clef
Films based on American novels
Films directed by Mark Robson
Films scored by Hugo Friedhofer
Films set in Chicago
Films set in New York City
1950s English-language films
1950s American films